The Boeing F3B was a biplane fighter and fighter bomber that served with the United States Navy from 1928 into the early 1930s.

Design and development
Designed by the company as its Model 74, the plane was an incremental improvement over the F2B. The Navy-designated prototype XF3B-1 still had the tapered wings of the F2B for instance, but was built as a single-float seaplane using the FB-5 undercarriage. However, the growing use of aircraft carriers took away most of the need for floating fighters, and by the time other test results had been taken into account, the production F3B-1 (Model 77) had a larger upper wing that was slightly swept back and a redesigned tail with surfaces made from corrugated aluminum. It also eliminated the spreader bar arrangement of the undercarriage and revised the vertical tail shape.

Operational history
It first flew on 3 February 1928, turning in a respectable performance and garnering Boeing a contract for 73 more. The aircraft remained in first-line service to 1932 and were then retained as "hacks" (command and staff transports) for several more years.

Variants
XF3B-1(Model 74) One prototype serial number A7674
F3B-1(Model 77) Single-seat fighter biplane for the US Navy, 73 aircraft serial numbers A7675-A7691; A7708-A7763

Operators

United States Navy

Specifications (F3B-1)

See also

References

Notes

Bibliography

 Eden, Paul and Soph Moeng, eds. The Complete Encyclopedia of World Aircraft. London: Amber Books, 2002. .
 Jones, Lloyd S. U.S. Naval Fighters. Fallbrook, California: Aero Publishers, 1977. .
 Swanborough, Gordon and Peter M. Bowers. United States Navy Aircraft Since 1911. Annapolis, Maryland: Naval Institute Press, 1976. .

External links
 Boeing F3B-1s on carrier deck
 

Boeing F3B
F3B
Carrier-based aircraft
Biplanes
Single-engined tractor aircraft
Aircraft first flown in 1928